Brahma is a Brazilian beer, originally made by the Companhia Cervejaria Brahma, which was founded in 1888. In 1914, Brahma produced their national Malzbier. After that, the company began expanding internationally. The company bought the license for distribution of the Germania brand, which later was known as Guanabara, and was one of the earliest of the Brazilian beer brands.

In 1934, Brahma introduced the new bottled draft Brahma Chopp, and it became a Brazilian bestseller. In 1989, Jorge Paulo Lemann, Carlos Alberto Sicupira and Marcel Telles bought Companhia Cervejaria Brahma for $50 million.

Brands
 Brahma – a 4.3% abv pale lager with a global distribution launched in 2004. It is based on the locally successful Brahma Chopp.
 Brahma Chopp – a 5% abv pale lager. Brahma's main brand in Brazil.
 Brahma Extra
 Brahma Malzbier – a 5% abv schwarzbier
 Brahma Black
 Brahma Fresh
 Brahma Light
 Brahma Ice (sold only in Venezuela and the Dominican Republic)
 Extra Light Brahma (Venezuela)
 Brahma Morena
 Brahma Bock
 Brahma Bier – special FIFA World Cup 2006 edition released in Brazil
 Brahma Porter
 Brahma Stout
 Brahva – a 4.8% abv pale lager sold in Guatemala and other Central American countries
 Brahva Beats
 Brahma Malta – non-alcoholic carbonated drink sold in Venezuela
 Brahma Malta con Chocolate – Brahma Malta with chocolate. It is sold in most supermarkets in Latrobe Valley.
 Brahma 0,0% – Alcohol-free beer.

Controversies 
An interfaith coalition is pressing the world's largest brewer to remove the name of a Hindu god (Brahma) from its beer brand. Brahma is a beer produced primarily for the Brazilian domestic market. Brahma was named after Joseph Bramah, the inventor of the draft pump valve, and as Anheuser Busch has already stated, has nothing to do at all with the Hindu religion.

Literature 
 Edgar Helmut Köb: Die Brahma-Brauerei und die Modernisierung des Getränkehandels in Rio de Janeiro 1888 bis 1930, Stuttgart 2005.

References

External links

 Brahma (Brazil)
 Brahma (Argentina)
 Brahma (Peru)
 Brahma Light (Dominican Republic)

Beer in Brazil
Brazilian brands